Hajji Moharab (also Romanized as Ḩājjī Moḥārab) is a village in Ahudasht Rural District, Shavur District, Shush County, Khuzestan Province, Iran. At the 2006 census, its population was 195, in 28 families.

References 

Populated places in Shush County